Daniel Zolghadri is an American actor known for his roles in Eighth Grade, Low Tide, and Funny Pages. He attended the Orange County School of the Arts.

Filmography

Film

Television

References 

Living people
Actors from Orange County, California
Year of birth missing (living people)